The 2000 du Maurier Open women's doubles was the doubles event of the ninety-ninth women's edition of the Canadian Open; a WTA Tier I tournament and the most prestigious women's tennis tournament held in Canada. Jana Novotná and Mary Pierce were the reigning champions, but Novotná retired from professional tennis in 1999 and Pierce did not compete at the tournament. Martina Hingis and Nathalie Tauziat won the title by defeating Julie Halard-Decugis and Ai Sugiyama 6–3, 3–6, 6–4 in the final. It was the 11th title for Hingis and the 21st title for Tauziat in their respective doubles careers.

Seeds
The first four seeds received a bye into the second round.

Draw

Finals

Top half

Bottom half

References
 Main and Qualifying Draws

Women's Doubles